Lorraine is the surname of:

 Andrew Lorraine (born 1972), American retired Major League Baseball pitcher
 Ed Lorraine (1928–2008), Canadian politician
 Guido Lorraine (1912–2009), Polish-born actor, musician and singer
 Harry Lorraine (American actor)
 Harry Lorraine (English actor) (1886–1934), English silent film actor
 Kay Lorraine, American former singer
 Lillian Lorraine (1892–1955), American stage and screen actress
 Louise Lorraine (1901–1981), American film actress
 Marie Lorraine (1899–1982), stage name of Australian actress Isabella Mercia McDonagh

See also 

 Loraine (name)